Linda Joy Svoboda Allen is an American mathematician and mathematical biologist, the Paul Whitfield Horn Professor of Mathematics and Statistics at Texas Tech University.

Education and career
Allen earned a bachelor's degree in mathematics in 1975 from the College of St. Scholastica, and a master's degree in 1978 and doctorate in 1978 from the University of Tennessee. Her dissertation, Applications of Differential Inequalities to Persistence and Extinction Problems for Reaction-Diffusion Systems, was supervised by Thomas G. Hallam.

After working as a visiting assistant professor at the University of Tennessee, she joined the faculty of the University of North Carolina at Asheville in 1982, and then moved to Texas Tech in 1985.

Recognition
In 2015 the Association for Women in Mathematics and Society for Industrial and Applied Mathematics (SIAM) honored her as their AWM-SIAM Sonia Kovalevsky Lecturer "for outstanding contributions in ordinary differential equations, difference equations and stochastic models, with significant applications in the areas of infectious diseases and ecology". In 2016 she became a SIAM Fellow.

Books
Allen is the author of three books:
An Introduction to Stochastic Processes with Applications to Biology (Pearson, 2003; 2nd ed., 2011)
An Introduction to Mathematical Biology (Prentice Hall, 2007)
Stochastic Population and Epidemic Models: Persistence and Extinction (Springer, 2015).

References

External links
Home page

Year of birth missing (living people)
Living people
20th-century American mathematicians
21st-century American mathematicians
American women mathematicians
College of St. Scholastica alumni
University of Tennessee alumni
University of North Carolina at Asheville faculty
Texas Tech University faculty
Fellows of the Society for Industrial and Applied Mathematics
20th-century women mathematicians
21st-century women mathematicians
20th-century American women
21st-century American women